Prince of Lanling may refer to:

Gao Changgong (541–573), Northern Qi general
Zhang Zhongwu (died 849), Tang dynasty general
Prince of Lan Ling (TV series), 2013 Chinese TV series, based on Gao Changgong's life